Sheykhali may refer to:

Sheykhali, Chaharmahal and Bakhtiari
Sheykhali, Lorestan

See also
Sheykh Ali (disambiguation)